Berutarube (Berutarube-zan) is a stratovolcano located at the southern end of Iturup Island, Kuril Islands, Russia.

See also
 List of volcanoes in Russia

References

External links 
 Berutarubesan (Berutarube): Global Volcanism Program - Smithsonian Institution
 Berutarubesan - Japan Meteorological Agency 
  - Japan Meteorological Agency
 Berutarube San - Geological Survey of Japan

Iturup
Stratovolcanoes of Russia
Mountains of the Kuril Islands
Volcanoes of the Kuril Islands